The women's 200 metre butterfly event at the 1968 Olympic Games took place 24 October. This swimming event used the butterfly stroke. Because an Olympic size swimming pool is 50 metres long, this race consisted of four lengths of the pool. This was the first time for this event for the women swimmers.

Medalists

Results

Heats
Heat 1

Heat 2

Heat 3

Heat 4

Final

Key: OR = Olympic record

References

Women's butterfly 200 metre
1968 in women's swimming
Women's events at the 1968 Summer Olympics